CSHL may refer to:

Carillon Senior Hockey League
Central States Hockey League
Club Sportif de Hammam-Lif, an association football club in Tunisia
Cold Spring Harbor Laboratory
Centre for the Study of Human Learning